Vojnica is a village in the municipality of Čaška, North Macedonia.

Demographics
According to the 2021 census, the village had a total of 11 inhabitants. Ethnic groups in the village include:

Macedonians 4
Albanians 1
Persons for whom data are taken from admin. sources 5
Others 1

References

Villages in Čaška Municipality
Albanian communities in North Macedonia